The women's 200 metre freestyle event at the 2012 Summer Olympics took place on 30–31 July at the London Aquatics Centre in London, United Kingdom.

U.S. swimmer Allison Schmitt blasted a new Olympic record with a stunning effort to capture the gold medal in the event for the first time, since Nicole Haislett topped the podium in 1992. She pulled away from a tightly packed field on the final lap to hit the wall first in a sterling time of 1:53.61, shaving 1.21 seconds off the record set by Italy's Federica Pellegrini from Beijing in 2008. After defeating Schmitt in a close duel to grab the 400 m freestyle title two days earlier, France's Camille Muffat trailed behind her rival by almost a body length for the silver in 1:55.58. Meanwhile, Australia's Bronte Barratt produced a striking touch to take home the bronze in 1:55.81, edging out American teenage star Missy Franklin by a hundredth of a second.

Franklin missed a chance to add her third career medal with a fourth-place time in 1:55.82, while Pellegrini, the defending Olympic champion, dropped off the podium to fifth in 1:56.73. Russia's Veronika Popova (1:57.25), Great Britain's home favorite Caitlin McClatchey (1:57.60) and Barratt's teammate Kylie Palmer (1:57.68) closed out the field.

Notable swimmers failed to reach the top-eight final roster including Slovenia's Sara Isaković, the defending silver medalist, who placed fourteenth (1:58.47) in the semifinals; and Romania's Camelia Potec, a four-time Olympian and 2004 Olympic champion, who posted a twenty-fifth place time (2:01.15) on the morning prelims.

Records
Prior to this competition, the existing world and Olympic records were as follows.

The following records were established during the competition:

Results

Heats

Semifinals

Semifinal 1

Semifinal 2

Final

References

External links
NBC Olympics Coverage

Women's 00200 metre freestyle
2012 in women's swimming
Women's events at the 2012 Summer Olympics